Fisherville is an unincorporated community and census-designated place (CDP) in Blair County, Pennsylvania, United States. It was first listed as a CDP prior to the 2020 census.

The CDP is in eastern Blair County, in the northeastern part of Woodbury Township. It is bordered to the west, across Clover Creek, by the community of Cove Forge. Shultz Road is the only through road in Fisherville, leading north to Cove Forge and south up Clover Creek towards Larke.

Demographics

References 

Census-designated places in Blair County, Pennsylvania
Census-designated places in Pennsylvania